A cage is an enclosure often made of mesh, bars, or wires, used to confine, contain or protect something or someone. A cage can serve many purposes, including keeping an animal or person in captivity, capturing an animal or person, and displaying an animal at a zoo.

Construction
Since a cage is usually intended to hold living beings, at least some part of its structure must be such as to allow for the entry of light and air.  Thus some cages may be made with bars spaced too closely together for the intended captive to slip between them, or with windows covered by a mesh of some sort.

Animal cages

Cages are often used to confine animals, and some are specially designed to fit a certain species of animal. One or more birds, rodents, reptiles, and even larger animals of certain breeds are sometimes confined in a cage as pets. 

Animal cages have been a part of human culture since ancient times. For example, an Ancient Greek vase dated to 490 B.C. depicts a boy holding a possibly domesticated rabbit on his lap, with a cage with an open door in the background. The biblical Book of Jeremiah refers to a tribe being like "cages full of birds", and the Book of Ezekiel describes the capture of a lion in which the captors "pulled him into a cage and brought him to the king of Babylon".

The different laws governing the keeping of animals in captivity generally provide for the size of cages or minimum equipment, depending on the species, whether for transport or for breeding. Swiss legislation, for example, defines minimum absolute internal dimensions for pet cages, but the Swiss Animal Protection organization (PSA) states that even if these dimensions comply with the law, they are far from being in line with the needs of species. It is therefore necessary in practice to provide a much higher vital space to ensure the well-being of the occupants.

Animal protection associations have often argued for improving transport conditions in cages and for bans on battery cages, especially for egg-laying hens. The European legislation is constantly changing, but consumer behavior also influences breeding conditions.

Trapping

Cages also serve as a trapping tool. This is a common and illegal purpose of the cage, as poaching is illegal itself. These type of cages are used to trap an animal, or hold them for a certain period of time. U.S. President Theodore Roosevelt used a cage himself to capture a bear, as the cage serves a purpose for capturing large animals.

Human cages

Punishment

In history, prisoners were sometimes kept in a cage. During the Vietnam War they were referred to as "tiger cages". Captives would sometimes be chained up inside into uncomfortable positions to intensify suffering. In medieval England, King Edward punished Robert the Bruce in by having two of his female supporters encaged in public.

Safety

 Safety cage, in automobile safety
 Roll cage, a frame built in or around the cab of a vehicle
 Shark-proof cage, used to protect divers

Entertainment
Cages are used in various forms of entertainment to create excitement from the sense that the entertainers are trapped in the cage. For example, cage dancing "refers to a scantily-clad feminine dancer, perhaps wearing a mini-skirt or hot- pants, and (supposedly) trapped inside of a hanging bird cage". Cage fighting involves two combatants, usually engaging in mixed martial arts, inside a cage-like structure, and "conjures up the image of two combatants trapped in a cage, trading vicious blows as the audience bays for blood". In Australia, a ban on the use of "cage-like enclosures" at such events was lifted in 2014. Steel cages are also one of the oldest form of enclosures used in professional wrestling. The first "steel cage match" of any kind took place on June 25, 1937 in Atlanta, Georgia. This match took place in a ring surrounded by chicken wire, in order to keep the athletes inside, and prevent any potential interference.

Homes

Engineering
 Rebar cages used in reinforced concrete
 Cage (bearing) – a component of a rolling-element bearing
 Gabion – a cage filled with coarse gravel or rock for use in civil engineering, road building, military applications and landscaping
 Mine cage – similar to an elevator, for a shaft mine
 Cage, a separated enclosure in a computer colocation centre
 Faraday cage – an enclosure used to block electric fields

Other uses
 Batting cage – an enclosure for baseball batting practice
 Bottle cage – a bicycle bottle holder
 Cage crinoline – a type of crinoline petticoat
 Cage trolley - used for transporting goods
 Fruit cage - used to protect fruit bushes from been eaten by birds

See also
 Aquarium
 Box
 Formicarium
 Gestation crate
 Iron maiden – an iron cabinet putative torture device
 Jungle gym – inspired by monkeys shaking the bars of a cage
 Pen (enclosure)
 Terrarium
 Vivarium

References

External links 
 
 

Containers
Buildings and structures used to confine animals
Metalworking
Building materials
Steel